Julien de Sousa Bardy (born Clermont-Ferrand, 3 April 1986) is a French-born Portuguese former rugby union player. He played as a flanker.

Club career
He played for ASM Clermont Auvergne in the Top 14 since 2009/10 to 2016/17. He won twice the Top 14 in 2009/10 and 2016/17. He played afterwards for Montpellier Hérault RC, from 2017/18 to 2019/20, when he finished his career, aged 34 years old.

International career
He is of Portuguese descent and decided to represent Portugal. He had 24 caps, with 5 tries scored, 25 points on aggregate, from 2008 to 2015. He had his first cap at the 13-21 loss to Canada, at 1 November 2008, in Lisbon, in a tour, when he played as a substitute. His final cap was at the 11-3 win over Germany, at 28 February 2015, in Lisbon, for the Six Nations B.

References

External links
 

1986 births
Living people
ASM Clermont Auvergne players
French rugby union players
Portuguese rugby union players
French people of Portuguese descent
Rugby union flankers
Sportspeople from Clermont-Ferrand
Portugal international rugby union players